Ilija Bozoljac and Igor Zelenay won the title, defeating defending champions Ken Skupski and Neal Skupski in the final 7–6(7–3), 4–6, [10–5]  .

Seeds

Draw

Draw

References
 Main Draw

Slovak Open – Doubles
2015 Doubles